Anjelah Nicole Johnson-Reyes (born May 14, 1982) is an American actress, comedian, and former NFL cheerleader. Johnson was a cast member on the series MADtv during its 13th season.  Her characters included a Vietnamese nail salon employee named Mỹ Linh/Tammy and a rude fast food employee turned music star named Bon Qui Qui (the latter of which has become popular outside of Johnson's short stint on MADtv).

Career
Johnson moved to Los Angeles in 2005 to pursue a career in comedy after a friend suggested that she join a joke-writing class. She took improv classes, and quickly began to headline her own shows. Her stand-up routine, comprising her impression of a Vietnamese nail salon employee, received a lot of attention on YouTube. In 2007, Johnson joined the cast of sketch comedy show MADtv as a featured performer. Due to the impending writers strike, Johnson was often given only a few lines in the scripts during her tenure, as the writers had to produce more scripts at a faster pace. However, her self-scripted character Bon Qui Qui, a fast-food employee who treats customers rudely, was received well and gained a similarly large YouTube following. In 2008, Johnson was nominated for an ALMA Award for Outstanding Female Performance in a Comedy Television Series for her work on MADtv.

Johnson was given her own one-hour Comedy Central special, Anjelah Johnson: That's How We Do It, in 2009. She also appeared in the films Alvin and the Chipmunks: The Squeakquel and Our Family Wedding, and provided her voice for the live-action adaptation of Marmaduke. As well, she was featured on the late night talk show Lopez Tonight, hosted by George Lopez.

Johnson became the "TC Girl", a spokesperson for Mexican restaurant Taco Cabana, in 2011. In 2012, Johnson became the national campaign spokesperson for the "Don't be an S.O.V." (single occupant vehicle) campaign led by vRide, the country's largest van pooling company, which encouraged single commuters (S.O.V.s) to rideshare, carpool, or vanpool.

In 2013, Johnson reprised her role as her MADtv character Bon Qui Qui for a skit released by Alexander Wang. Johnson's second stand-up comedy special titled Homecoming Show followed and premiered on Netflix.  It was filmed in San Jose, California.

In 2014, Anjelah was featured as her signature character Bon Qui Qui in a parody music video directed by Randal Kirk II "This Is How We Do It" for the Benefit cosmetics, which features social media influencer, Britney Furlan.

On October 1, 2015, Johnson's third stand-up special, titled Anjelah Johnson: Not Fancy, was released on Netflix. It was filmed in southern California.

Personal life
Johnson was born and raised in San Jose, California, in a devout Christian family and remains a Christian. She is of Mexican and Native American descent. She was a Pop Warner cheerleader from the age of 8 and was active in soccer, softball, and track; she also practiced hip hop and break dancing. She began acting as a senior in high school and was especially interested in imitating different accents. She later studied speech communications at De Anza College. She subsequently became a cheerleader for the Oakland Raiders after being inducted in 2002. As a member of the Oakland Raiderettes, she was named Rookie of the Year and performed at Super Bowl XXXVII.

Johnson married Group 1 Crew member Manwell Reyes on June 11, 2011, in Half Moon Bay, California. Previously, she stated the couple did not want children of their own, although they enjoy spending time with their nieces and nephews. On December 29, 2022 the couple announced they were expecting a baby in 2023.

Filmography

Film

Television

Discography

Studio albums
As Bon Qui Qui:

Extended plays
As Bon Qui Qui:
 The Come Up (2012)

Music videos
As Bon Qui Qui:

Awards and nominations

References

External links
 
 
 
 

1982 births
Living people
American female dancers
Dancers from California
American Christians
American film actresses
American impressionists (entertainers)
American television actresses
American actresses of Mexican descent
National Football League cheerleaders
American women comedians
American people who self-identify as being of Native American descent
Actresses from San Jose, California
American cheerleaders
Oakland Raiders personnel
American sketch comedians
Comedians from California
21st-century American comedians
21st-century American actresses